Grashan Liyanage (born 15 October 1963) is a Sri Lankan former first-class cricketer who played for Galle Cricket Club. Later, he became an umpire and stood in matches in the 2007–08 Inter-Provincial Twenty20 tournament.

References

External links
 

1963 births
Living people
Sri Lankan cricketers
Sri Lankan cricket umpires
People from Matara, Sri Lanka